Kâmpóng Cham Airport  is a public use airport located near Kâmpóng Cham, Kâmpóng Cham, Cambodia.

See also
List of airports in Cambodia

References

External links 
 Airport record for Kâmpóng Cham Airport at Landings.com

Airports in Cambodia
Buildings and structures in Kampong Cham province